The Southern Railway Ss was a class of 2-10-2 "Santa Fe" type steam locomotives built in 1917 and 1918 for the Southern Railway (SOU). They were assigned to haul and bank heavy freight trains over the Saluda Grade and Old Fort Loops in the Blue Ridge Mountains of North Carolina.

History
The first batches of fifty-five locomotives (Nos. 5000-5054) were built in 1917 by the Baldwin Locomotive Works in Philadelphia, Pennsylvania. In 1918, the second batches of twenty-five 2-10-2s (Nos. 6350-6374) were built by the American Locomotive Company (ALCO) of Richmond, Virginia for SOU's Cincinnati, New Orleans and Texas Pacific (CNO&TP) division, but were later renumbered to 5055-5079 when being moved to Southern's main division.

These locomotives were designed to haul heavy freight trains, but were proven too slow to work on the Southern Railway's Washington, D.C. to Atlanta main line and too big for the CNO&TP tunnels' tight clearances. However, the Ss locomotives were very efficient on handling the mountain grades in North and South Carolina, Georgia, and Tennessee. Eventually, they were moved to Southern's Asheville and Knoxville divisions to bank and haul heavy freight trains, especially on Saluda Grade between Asheville, North Carolina and Spartanburg, South Carolina and the Old Fort Loops between Asheville and Salisbury, North Carolina in the Blue Ridge Mountains.

To work on the Asheville division, the Ss locomotives were modified with two water gauges made longer for the engineer and fireman to safely measure the water level in the boiler while going up and down the railway grades. Additionally, the Ss locomotives were equipped with a second air pump due to the excessive use of air brakes. While they were used to bank the head end passenger trains, the Ss locomotives were given cab signals and steam brake connection; and the water pipes were added to cool down the driving wheels' tires while descending the mountains. 

By the late 1940s, the Southern Railway began to dieselize with the Ss steam locomotives' duties taken over by the EMD F7 diesel locomotives. All of the Ss steam locomotives were retired and scrapped by the early 1950s, with none surviving into preservation.

See also
USRA Light Santa Fe

References

Bibliography

Further reading

External link

Southern 2-10-2 "Santa Fe" Locomotives in the USA

2-10-2 locomotives
ALCO locomotives
Baldwin locomotives
Railway locomotives introduced in 1917
Scrapped locomotives
Standard gauge locomotives of the United States
Steam locomotives of Southern Railway (U.S.)
Steam locomotives of the United States